Thaon is a French surname that may refer to the following notable people:
Charles Thaon (1910–2000), French speed skater
Charles-François Thaon, Count of Saint-André (1725–1807), army commander for the Kingdom of Sardinia
Paolo Ignazio Maria Thaon di Revel (1888–1973), Italian politician and fencer
Paolo Thaon di Revel (1859–1948), Italian admiral
Italian offshore patrol vessel Paolo Thaon di Revel

See also

Thon (name)

French-language surnames